Lasith Embuldeniya (born 26 October 1996) is a professional Sri Lankan cricketer who plays Test match cricket for Sri Lanka. He made his international debut for the Sri Lanka cricket team in February 2019, and plays for Nondescripts Cricket Club in domestic cricket.

Domestic career
He made his first-class debut for Nondescripts Cricket Club in the 2016–17 Premier League Tournament on 28 January 2017. He made his List A debut for Matara District in the 2016–17 Districts One Day Tournament on 17 March 2017.

In March 2018, he was named in Colombo's squad for the 2017–18 Super Four Provincial Tournament. The following month, he was also named in Colombo's squad for the 2018 Super Provincial One Day Tournament. In August 2018, he was named in Colombo's squad the 2018 SLC T20 League.

He made his Twenty20 debut on 4 January 2020, for Nondescripts Cricket Club in the 2019–20 SLC Twenty20 Tournament. In March 2020, in round seven of the 2019–20 Premier League Tournament, Embuldeniya took nine wickets for 86 runs in the second innings of the match against Saracens Sports Club.

In October 2020, he was drafted by the Kandy Tuskers for the inaugural edition of the Lanka Premier League. In August 2021, he was named in the SLC Greens team for the 2021 SLC Invitational T20 League tournament. However, prior to the first match, he failed a fitness test.

International career
In December 2018, he was named in Sri Lanka team for the 2018 ACC Emerging Teams Asia Cup. In February 2019, he was named in Sri Lanka's Test squad for their series against South Africa. He made his Test debut for Sri Lanka against South Africa on 13 February 2019. In the match, Embuldeniya became the fourth bowler and first left arm spinner for Sri Lanka to take a five-wicket haul on Test debut, finishing with figures of 5 for 66. In the second Test match of the series, Embuldeniya dislocated a finger during the first day, and was ruled out for six weeks.

On 20 January 2020, during the first Test against Zimbabwe, Embuldeniya took his second five wicket haul. He was the only specialist spinner of the team and took 5 for 114 runs to restrict Zimbabwe for 358. During the second innings, Embuldeniya took two wickets, with Sri Lanka winning by ten wickets. After poor performances in both the Bangladesh series and the first Test against Australia, Embuldeniya was dropped from the squad.

References

External links
 

1996 births
Living people
Sri Lankan cricketers
Sri Lanka Test cricketers
Matara District cricketers
Nondescripts Cricket Club cricketers
Cricketers from Colombo
Cricketers who have taken five wickets on Test debut
Kandy Falcons cricketers